Shaun Reynolds is a British music producer, singer & songwriter, who became famous through his online posts on YouTube.

In 2013, Reynolds made his major-label writing debut on Tyler Ward's Honestly album with the track "The Way We Are".

Discography

Writing Credits

Singles

Writing Credits

References

External links

Year of birth missing (living people)
Living people
British record producers
British male singers
British songwriters
British male songwriters